Tereza Srbová (born 23 June 1983 in Prague) is a Czech actress, writer and model best known for her roles in David Cronenberg's Eastern Promises, Trevor Nunn's Red Joan, HBO/Cinemax series Strike Back and Tom Clancy's Jack Ryan

Early life
When Srbova was a child she sang in the Czech children's choir Bambini di Praga.

She earned a master's degree in culture anthropology from the Faculty of Arts, Charles University.

Modeling
While undertaking her studies, she was approached by Elite Model Management Paris and appeared in many high-end campaigns such as Christian Dior, Mauboussin, Clarins, Crombie and Martini. 
She spent a year as an in-house model for designer Azzedine Alaïa.  
She has been photographed for many magazines such as L'Officiel, Elle, Harper's Bazaar, Cosmopolitan, Vogue, The Face, Surface, FHM and Madame Figaro.
From 2001 to 2006 she appeared in numerous print and television commercials, including Panasonic, Evian, Wrigley, T-Mobile, Jaguar Cars, Absolut Vodka, Oriflame, Keri Lotion and Beck's Brewery.

Acting
In 2007 she transitioned to acting when her first audition won her the role of Kirilenko in David Cronenberg's 2007 film Eastern Promises. 
That same year, she appeared in the films St. Trinian's and Eichmann, followed in 2008 with a role in Inkheart. 

In 2010 Srbova played her first lead role, as Silka in the Lionsgate horror Siren. In this film, Srbova performed the song "Elephants" by Warpaint.

In 2013, Srbova played the recurring role of agent Major Nina Pirogova in the Cinemax television series Strike Back: Shadow Warfare, reprising her role in the 2015 series Strike Back: Legacy.

In 2019 Srbova co-starred in the spy drama Red Joan opposite Judi Dench and Sophie Cookson. The film premiered at Toronto International Film Festival in 2018.

In 2022 Srbova appears as Jana Breza in four episodes of the third season of Tom Clancy's Jack Ryan

Writing and Directing
In 2017 Srbova wrote and directed her short film debut, Meanders. It received a short film award at the Ischia Global Film Festival (Italy), a special jury mention at Fano Film Festival (Italy), screened as part of the official selection at Sose International Film Festival (Armenia) and received the Award of Excellence at Canada Shorts. 

Her first book, a graphic novel Sidonie, came out in October 2021 at Labyrint Publishing Prague. Its story is based on the biography of Sidonie Nádherná.

Filmography

Film
Eastern Promises (2007)
St Trinian's (2007)
Eichmann (2007)
Inkheart (2008)
Siren (2010)
360 (2011)
The Inside (2012)
Red Joan (2018)

Television
Strike Back: Shadow Warfare (2013) - 3 episodes
 Strike Back: Legacy (2015) - 3 episodes
Houdini & Doyle (2016) - 1 episode
Tom Clancy's Jack Ryan (2022) - 4 episodes

External links
 
 
 
 
 

Living people
1983 births
Actresses from Prague
Czech film actresses
Czech television actresses
Czech expatriates in England
Charles University alumni